African Minds is a nonprofit open access publisher based in Cape Town.

African Minds is a member of the Open Access Scholarly Publishers Association. It joined the organization to get external review of the quality of its publishing practices and to contribute to higher standards for open access publishing.

A board member of African Minds said that academic publishing in developing markets cannot consistently be profitable, and consequently, nonprofit organizations like African Minds should be available to provide new publishing models to promote research in those places.

References

External links

Book publishing companies of South Africa
Mass media in Cape Town